The Seven Messengers is a collection of short stories written by Dino Buzzati and published as a book in 1942. It contains nineteen short tales, in which the characters often interact with the presence of the fantastic and/or death, many of which are left unconcluded, leaving the reader in suspense or trying to guess their ending. "The Seven Messengers" is also the name of the book's first short story.

The story "Sette piani" was the basis for the 1967 film The Seventh Floor.

Stories
 I sette messaggeri
 L'assalto al Grande Convoglio
 Sette piani
 Ombra del sud
 Eppure battono alla porta
 Eleganza militare
 Temporale sul fiume
 L'uomo che si dava arie
 Il memoriale
 Cèvere
 Il mantello
 L'uccisione del drago
 Una cosa che comincia per elle
 Il dolore notturno
 Notizie false
 Quando l'ombra scende
 Vecchio facocero
 Il sacrilegio
 Di notte in notte

References

1942 short story collections
Books adapted into films
Italian short story collections
Works by Dino Buzzati
Arnoldo Mondadori Editore books